David John Wainwright (born 21 March 1985) is an English first-class cricketer, who played for Yorkshire from 2004 to 2011 and Derbyshire from 2012 to 2015. He is a left arm orthodox spin bowler, who has also played for British Universities and Loughborough UCCE.

Life and career
He was educated at Hemsworth High School and Loughborough University, and is now a full-time cricketer. He started playing cricket at Castleford Cricket Club.

He appeared for England as a substitute fielder, during the second Test match against the West Indies, at Headingley in 2007.

In July 2009, Wainwright joined then fellow Yorkshire cricketer, Matthew Hoggard, by signing up with a new sponsor, Woodworm.

In February 2010, Wainwright played for England Lions versus Pakistan A in Dubai. He took three wickets for 26 in the match.

In September 2011, Yorkshire County Cricket Club announced that Wainwright had exercised the clause in his contract where he can request to be released, if he is not playing regular first team cricket. In 2012, Wainwright moved to Derbyshire and took a first-class, career-best return of 6 for 33, on his debut for them against Northamptonshire. He was released from his Derbyshire contract in August 2015.

References

External links
 

1985 births
Living people
English cricketers
Yorkshire cricketers
Cricketers from Pontefract
Alumni of Loughborough University
Loughborough MCCU cricketers
Derbyshire cricketers
British Universities cricketers
Shropshire cricketers
English cricketers of the 21st century
Hampshire cricketers